Fallsburg is an unincorporated community in Lawrence County, Kentucky, United States.

Fallsburg was once the site of a busy mill.

Notable people
Paul E. Patton, governor of Kentucky
K.C. Potter, academic administrator and LGBT rights activist

References

Unincorporated communities in Lawrence County, Kentucky
Unincorporated communities in Kentucky